The 20-Year Strategy for the Irish Language 2010–2030 is a 20-year strategy launched by the Government of Ireland on 20 December 2010 and which will be in operation until December 2030. The main aim of the Strategy is to increase the number of daily Irish speakers in Ireland to 250,000 by 2030. In the 2011 census this number was 77,185. In the 2016 census it had dropped to 73,803.

In June 2018 Minister of State for the Irish Language, Gaeltacht and the Islands  Joe McHugh TD launched the first cross-governmental Action Plan for the 20-Year Strategy for the Irish Language 2010–2030 which is operating between 2018 and 2022.

See also
 Údarás na Gaeltachta
 Gaeltacht Act 2012
 Bailte Seirbhíse Gaeltachta Gaeltacht Service Towns
 Líonraí Gaeilge Irish Language Networks
 Official Languages Act 2003
 Irish language outside Ireland
 Scottish Gaelic Gaeilge na hAlban / Gàidhlig
 Gàidhealtachd Scots Gaelic speaking regions in Scotland.

References

External links
 English-language version of the paper

Irish-language education
Department of Tourism, Culture, Arts, Gaeltacht, Sport and Media
2010 in Ireland